Part XVI of the Constitution of India establishes that certain castes and tribes shall be represented in the Lok Sabha (the lower house in India's bicameral legislature) in proportion to their population—that is, if the specified caste makes up 20% of the population in a given province, at least 20% of that province's members of the Lok Sabha must be of that caste. The Constitution specifies that this is to be accomplished "as nearly as may be", accepting that due to limited delegation size proportions  not always match exactly.

Provisions

330. Reservation of seats for Scheduled Castes and Scheduled Tribes in the House of the People.

331. Representation of the Anglo-Indian Community in the House of the People.

332. Reservation of seats for Scheduled Castes and Scheduled Tribes in the Legislative Assemblies of the States.

333. Representation of the Anglo-Indian community in the Legislative Assemblies of the States.

334. Reservation of seats and special representation to cease after certain period. 
This provision limits the reservation for Scheduled castes and Tribes by ending it 10 years from commencement of the constitution i.e., 1960 initially. The expiry date was later extended by 10 years by multiple amendments. The latest amendment extending it to 25 January 2030.

Text 
Notwithstanding anything in the foregoing provisions of this Part, the provisions of this Constitution relating to—

(a) the reservation of seats for the Scheduled Castes and the Scheduled Tribes in the House of the People and in the Legislative Assemblies of the States; and

(b) the representation of the Anglo-Indian community in the House of the People and in the Legislative Assemblies of the States by nomination,

shall cease to have effect on the expiration of a period of [eighty years in respect of clause (a)and seventy years in respect of clause (b)]from the commencement of this Constitution: Provided that nothing in this article shall affect any representation in the House of the People or in the Legislative Assembly of a State until the dissolution of the then existing House or Assembly, as the case may be.

Amendments 
8th Amendment - Reservation extended up to 25th January, 1970.

23rd Amendment - Reservation extended up to 25th January, 1980.

45th Amendment - Reservation extended up to 25th January, 1990.

62nd Amendment - Reservation extended up to 25th January, 2000.

79th Amendment - Reservation extended up to 25th January, 2010.

95th Amendment - Reservation extended up to 25th January, 2020.

104th Amendment - Reservation extended up to 25th January, 2030.

335. Claims of Scheduled Castes and Scheduled Tribes to services and posts.

336. Special provision for Anglo-Indian community in certain services.

337. Special provision with respect to educational grants for the benefit of Anglo-Indian community.

338. National Commission for Scheduled Casts. 

338A.National Commission for scheduled Tribes

338B. National Commission for Backward Classes.

339. Control of the Union over the administration of Scheduled Areas and the welfare of Scheduled Tribes.

340. Appointment of a Commission to investigate the conditions of backward classes

341. Scheduled  Castes.

342. Scheduled Tribes.

342A. Socially and educationally backward classes.

References

Sources

Part XVI text from wikisource

Part 16